Lev Tolstoy is a 1984 Soviet drama film directed by Sergey Gerasimov.

Plot 
The film tells about the life and death of the great Russian writer Lev Tolstoy.

Cast 
 Sergey Gerasimov as Lev Tolstoy
 Tamara Makarova as Sophia Tolstaya
 Borivoj Navrátil as Dushan Petrovich Makovitsky
 Aleksey Petrenko as Vladimir Chertkov
 Marina Ustimenko as Tatiana Sukhotina-Tolstaya
 Yekaterina Vasilyeva as Alexandra Tolstaya
 Yan Yanakiyev as Sergei Tolstoy
 Viktor Proskurin as Andrei Lvovich  
 Nikolai Yeremenko Jr. as Alexander Goldenweiser 
 Aleksey Shmarinov as   Sergiyenko
 Vyacheslav Nevinny as  Miklekseich
 Vladimir Kashpur as  Tolstoy's companion on the train
 František Desset as Nikitin
 Lyudmila Zaytseva as episode

References

External links 
 

1984 films
1980s Russian-language films
Soviet drama films
1984 drama films
Films shot in Moscow
Films shot in Russia
Works about Leo Tolstoy
Cultural depictions of Leo Tolstoy
Biographical films about writers
Soviet biographical drama films
1980s biographical drama films
Films directed by Sergei Gerasimov
Gorky Film Studio films